Exmouth is a town in Devon, England.

Exmouth may also refer to:

Places
Exmouth, Western Australia
Exmouth Island, Canadian Arctic Archipelago
Exmouth Peninsula, Southern Chile

People
Viscount Exmouth, a title in the peerage of the United Kingdom
Edward Pellew, 1st Viscount Exmouth (1757–1833), a British naval officer

Other uses
 Five ships of the British Royal Navy have been named HMS Exmouth
 Exmouth, a Magnolia grandiflora cultivar